The 1970 Cal State Los Angeles Diablos football team represented California State College at Los Angeles—now known as California State University, Los Angeles—as a member of the Pacific Coast Athletic Association (PCAA) during the 1970 NCAA University Division football season. Led by Ron Enger in his first and only season as head coach, Cal State Los Angeles compiled an overall record of 1–9 with a mark of 0–4 in conference play, placing last out of seven teams in the PCAA. The Diablos were shut out three times and scored only 54 points for the season while allowing up 325. Cal State Los Angeles played home games at the East Los Angeles College Stadium in Monterey Park, California.

Schedule

References

Cal State Los Angeles
Cal State Los Angeles Diablos football seasons
Cal State Los Angeles Diablos football